Sports in San Antonio includes a number of professional major and minor league sports teams. The American city of San Antonio, Texas also has college, high school, and other amateur or semi-pro sports teams.

The city's only top-level professional sports team, and consequently the team most San Antonians follow, is the San Antonio Spurs of the National Basketball Association. The Spurs have been playing in San Antonio since 1973 and have won five NBA Championships (1999, 2003, 2005, 2007, and 2014). Previously, the Spurs played at the Alamodome, which was built for football, and before that the HemisFair Arena, but the Spurs built – with public money – and moved into the SBC Center in 2002, since renamed the AT&T Center, following the merger of SBC and AT&T.

San Antonio is home to the Double-A Minor League Baseball affiliate of the San Diego Padres, the San Antonio Missions, who play at Nelson Wolff Stadium on the west side of the city.

The University of Texas at San Antonio and the University of the Incarnate Word fields San Antonio's two college athletic teams.

Professional sports
San Antonio is home to one major league professional sports team: the National Basketball Association's, San Antonio Spurs. San Antonio is also home to minor league professional sports teams in baseball, basketball, and soccer.

San Antonio is also occasionally home to international professional sports events. The April 15, 2014 soccer match at the Alamodome between the United States and Mexico sold a record 65,000 tickets, with tickets sold out over two months in advance. This beat the city's previous record for a soccer match of 54,313, set in January 2014 for a friendly between Mexico and South Korea.

Notes:
 The Spurs were formerly the Dallas Chaparrals (1967-1970, 1971-1973), formerly the Texas Chaparrals (1970-1971)
 The current AAA team San Antonio Missions moved from Colorado Springs for the Milwaukee Brewers
 The San Antonio Missions were AA Team in the Texas League and moved to Amarillo in 2018 at which time San Antonio got an AAA team, which maintained the same name.
 The Missions moved to Amarillo as a AA team and were renamed the Amarillo Sod Poodles
 The Missions have 14 total championship titles, 1 in the Dixie series and 13 in the Texas League.
 The San Antonio Missions were part of AAA ball from 2019-2020, but went back to AA in 2021 with the shuffling of teams within the league

Current semi-professional teams

National and international events
  NCAA football bowl game Alamo Bowl each December
 U.S. Olympic Festival in 1993
 NCAA Final four host - men's tournament:  1998, 2004, 2008, 2018, and 2025
 NCAA Final four host - women's tournament:  2002, 2010, 2021 and 2029
 NBA All-Star Game:  1996
 NABC All-Star Game:  1998
 WNBA All-Star Game:  2011
 2023 XFL Championship game site (Alamodome)

NCAA college football

NCAA college basketball

* Beginning in 2019, the St. Mary's Rattlers will be in the Lone Star Conference.

** The St. Mary's Rattlers won the NAIA national title in 1989.

*** The Trinity Tigers appeared in the post-season tournament in 1998, 2000, 2003, 2004, 2005, 2006, 2009, 2012, 2013, and 2014.

Marathon
 Rock 'n' Roll Marathon 
The San Antonio Rock 'n' Roll Marathon started in 2007 and is part of the nationwide Rock 'n' Roll Marathon series.  Events include full marathon, half marathon, 10K, 5K, 13.1 relay, and kids rock run.

Motorsports
Alamo City Motorplex (formerly known as San Antonio Raceway) is a 1/4 mile drag strip with a 1/2 mile of shutdown space. It has a seating capacity of 13,000. The facility is an NHRA Member Track and also hosts a number of large yearly events including Bounty Hunters No-Prep, Midnight Grudge Fest, Club Loose Drifting, Summit Series Bracket Racing, and weekly test and tune sessions.

High school
San Antonio is home of the U.S. Army All-American Bowl, played annually in the Alamodome and televised live on NBC. The Bowl is an East versus West showdown featuring the nation's top 90 high school senior football players. The game has featured NFL stars Reggie Bush, Vince Young, Adrian Peterson, and many other college and NFL stars. The U.S. Army All-American Bowl also includes the U.S. Army All-American Marching Band, the U.S. Army National Combine, and the U.S. Army Coaches Academy, all of which take place in San Antonio during the week leading up to the game itself.

The U.S. Army All-American Marching Band features 91 of the nation's top high school senior marching musicians who perform during halftime of the U.S. Army All-American Bowl. The U.S. Army National Combine features 500 of the nation's top high school underclassman football players. The U.S. Army Coaches Academy features 100 of the nation's top high school football coaches, including the coaches of each U.S. Army All-American.

Club teams
San Antonio is also home to the San Antonio Gaelic Athletic Club, which was established in early 2011. The SAGAC plays in a Texas League with teams from Austin, Dallas, and Houston. The season ranges from April to the end of August, when the team competes at the North American Gaelic Athletic Association tournament every Labor Day Weekend. The club also has two inter-squad teams, the San Patricios and the I.C.A (Irish Citizen Army), that compete in a pub league in the fall.

History

The city served as a temporary home for the New Orleans Saints for the 2005 NFL season due to the effects of Hurricane Katrina. The Saints set up practice facilities in San Antonio for the season, and played a split home schedule between the Alamodome and Baton Rouge, Louisiana's Tiger Stadium during the 2005 season. After the final game in San Antonio, the Saints committed to moving back to New Orleans for the 2006 season. City officials are said to be attempting to lure the National Football League permanently to San Antonio and have also said that a strong showing at the Alamodome for the three local Saints games was vital to showing that San Antonio can support an NFL franchise. NFL Commissioner Paul Tagliabue said that San Antonio was successful in hosting the team, and that the city would be on the short list for any future NFL expansions. The city has also hosted the Dallas Cowboys' and Houston Oilers' preseason camps in the past, and they signed a contract with the Cowboys in which the Cowboys practiced in San Antonio through 2011. Cowboys owner Jerry Jones has acknowledged his support for the city's efforts to become home to an NFL franchise. Although it is the largest city in the United States without an NFL team, San Antonio's smaller metropolitan population has so far contributed to its lack of landing an NFL, MLB, or NHL team.

San Antonio has fielded teams in two attempted major league football rivals to the NFL, both at Alamo Stadium: in 1975, the Florida Blazers of the World Football League relocated to San Antonio as the Wings for one season before the league ceased operations; and in 1984, the San Antonio Gunslingers joined the United States Football League as an expansion team and played for two seasons before the league folded. The San Antonio Riders were one of the founding teams of the World League of American Football, the NFL's one-time spring developmental league, in 1991. They played for two seasons before the North American teams were disbanded and the WLAF became a strictly European league. During the Canadian Football League's brief expansion into the U.S., the city played host to the San Antonio Texans for a single season in 1995, following the team's relocation from Sacramento after two seasons. San Antonio was also home to two minor league football franchises: the Toros of the Texas Football League (later Continental Football League, then Trans-American Football League) from 1966-1971; and the Charros of the American Football Association from 1978-1981. After the 2011 Arena Football League season, the Tulsa Talons relocated from Oklahoma and played two seasons in San Antonio before folding in 2014.

In March 2006, the city made an offer to build a stadium for the struggling Florida Marlins baseball franchise. However, the Marlins and Major League Baseball declined the offer.

In 2005, the city approached Major League Soccer with an interest in placing a soccer franchise in the vacant Alamodome. Both the city and the league seemed to be in harmony, with the council voting 9-2 in favor of the new San Antonio team, citing that it would reduce the financial burden of the stadium on the city by providing it with a permanent tenant without extra financial costs as the necessary upgrading of facilities at the dome would have to take place regardless of a team moving in or not. The following week an 8-3 vote carried the second part of the plan, which would see a major new youth soccer complex being built in the city to compete for what was described as the lucrative Texas youth soccer event market. At the time it was stated that San Antonio had only a fraction of the youth soccer facilities available in other Texan cities of Dallas, Houston and Austin. All seemed to be in place and plans on course until a media campaign against the soccer proposals exposing that the team would only be leased with the Alamodome for three years. After three years the team would have to vacate to a soccer-specific stadium.

After Hurricane Katrina, the city set their goal of earning an NFL franchise. The prospects for the franchise were further hindered when it became a political football during the election for Mayor, which was won by Phil Hardberger who instantly distanced the city from any deal with MLS. MLS meanwhile released a statement claiming that they had planned to withdraw before the election but did not wish to comment until afterwards in order to "respect the electoral process in San Antonio." The deal died with both sides blaming each other for its demise.

In 2018, the Alliance of American Football announced that the San Antonio Commanders would play in the city beginning in 2019. The Commanders opened play at the Alamodome in February 2019; however, the league folded in the same year.

Former teams

Professional athletes from San Antonio

See also
 List of baseball parks in San Antonio
 List of defunct Texas sports teams
 List of Texas sports teams
 List of people from San Antonio

References